The following is a list of notable authors of Slovak prose and drama.

Baroque (1650–1780)

 Matthias Bel (1684–1749)
 Adam František Kollár (1718–1783)
 Daniel Sinapius-Horčička (1640–1688)

Classicism (1780–1840) 

 Jozef Ignác Bajza (1755–1836)
 Juraj Fándly (1750–1811)
 Ján Chalupka (1791–1871)
 Ján Kollár (1793–1852)
 Pavol Jozef Šafárik (Pavel Josef Šafařík) (1795–1861)

Romanticism (1840–1850) 

 Pavol Dobšinský (1828–1885)
 Michal Miloslav Hodža (1811–1870)
 Jozef Miloslav Hurban (1817–1888)
 Ľudovít Štúr (1815–1856)
 Samo Tomášik (1813–1887)

Between Romanticism and Realism (1850–1875) 

 Jakub Grajchman (1822–1897)
 Jonáš Záborský (1812–1876)

Realism (1875–1905) 

 Janko Alexy (1894–1970)
 Pavol Országh Hviezdoslav (1849–1921)
 Martin Kukučín (1860–1928)
 Kristína Royová (1860–1936)
 Jozef Gregor-Tajovský (1874–1940)
 Timrava (Božena Slančíková) (1867–1951)
 Svetozár Hurban-Vajanský (1847–1916)

Modernism (1905–1918) 

 Janko Jesenský (1874–1945)
 Ivan Krasko (1876–1958)

Between the World Wars (1918–1948) 

 Vladimír Clementis (1902–1952)
 Margita Figuli (1909–1995)
 Jozef Cíger-Hronský (1896–1960)
 Dobroslav Chrobák (1907–1951)
 Štefan Krčméry (1892–1955)
 Ladislav Nádaši-Jégé (1866–1940)
 Ľudo Ondrejov (1901–1962)
 Martin Rázus (1888–1937)
 Ivan Stodola (1888–1977)
 František Švantner (1912–1950)
 Milo Urban (1904–1982)

Literature after World War II (1948–1964) 

 Jozef Dunajovec (1933–2007)
 Andrej Brázda-Jankovský (1915–2008)
 Katarína Lazarová (1914 –1995)
 Ladislav Mňačko (1919–1994)
 Hana Zelinová (1914–2004)
 Štefan Žáry (1918–2007)

Contemporary literature (1964–1995) 
 Emil Benčík (born 1933)
 Ladislav Grosman (1921–1981)
 Anton Hykisch (born 1932)
 Peter Jaroš (born 1940)
 Milan Lasica (born 1940)
 Hana Ponická (1922–2007)
 Miriam Roth (1910–2005)
 Július Satinský (1941–2002)
 Dušan Slobodník (1927–2001)
 Ladislav Švihran (1931–2022)
 Vojtech Zamarovský (1919–2006)
 Zuzka Zguriška (1900–1984)

Contemporary literature (since 1995)

 Radovan Brenkus (born 1974)
 Juraj Červenák (born 1974)
 Dušan Fabian (born 1975)
 Michal Hvorecký (born 1976)
 Jozef Karika (born 1978)
 Ľuba Lesná (born 1954)
 Vladimir Oravsky (born 1947)
 Peter Pišťanek (1960–2015)
 Radoslav Rochallyi (born 1980)
 Miroslav Šustek (born 1947)

See also 
 List of Slovak poets

Slovak
 
Authors